1927 was the 34th season of County Championship cricket in England. Lancashire retained the title. A New Zealand team toured but there were no Test matches. Douglas Jardine and Harold Larwood topped the batting and bowling averages respectively.

Honours
County Championship - Lancashire
Minor Counties Championship - Staffordshire
Wisden Cricketers of the Year, named in the 1928 edition of Wisden Cricketers' Almanack – Roger Blunt, Charlie Hallows, Wally Hammond, Douglas Jardine, Vallance Jupp

County Championship

Leading batsmen 
Douglas Jardine topped the averages with 1002 runs @ 91.09

Leading bowlers 
Harold Larwood topped the averages with 100 wickets @ 16.95

References

Annual reviews
 Wisden Cricketers' Almanack 1928

External links
 CricketArchive – season summary

1927 in English cricket
English cricket seasons in the 20th century